The Final Wish is a 2018 mystery-horror film written by Jeffrey Reddick, Jonathan Doyle and William Halfon and co-produced by Jeffrey Reddick, directed by Timothy Woodward Jr. and starring Lin Shaye and Michael Welch. The movie is distributed by Cinedigm Entertainment Group. The Final Wish was released on October 17, 2018 at the Screamfest Horror Film Festival.

Plot
Aaron Hammond is forced to return home when his father suddenly dies. While dealing with grief and trying to support his mother, Kate, he finds an urn in his father's belongings. He soon finds that the object is capable of making wishes and desires come true. What he doesn't know is that the price for this may be too high to pay.

Cast
Lin Shaye as Kate Hammond
Michael Welch as Aaron Hammond
Melissa Bolona as Lisa
Spencer Locke as Lynette 
Tony Todd as Colin
Kaiwi Lyman-Mersereau as Derek (credited as "Kaiwi Lyman")
Jonathan Daniel Brown as Jeremy

Reception
Frank Ochieng from the "SF Crowsnest" gave the film 2.5 out of 4 stars and stated: "Wish is strangely contemplative in its attempt to shine an eerie light on the mysteries of death and estrangement. Woodward's gory gem is more of the psychological horror variety as it adequately taps into the realm of a messy mindset gone haywire." Noel Murray, reviewing for the newspaper Los Angeles Times, opined, "By the time 'The Final Wish' gets to the much more effective suspense sequences - and the enjoyably perverse twists - it's too little and too late." Jennie Kermode from the online magazine "Eye for Film" gave the movie 3.5 out of 5 stars and wrote: "Focused primarily on psychological horror but also dealing out a fair number of shocks and scares, The Final Wish is a well-crafted film that's likely to appeal to a broad range of genre fans."

References

External links

2018 horror films
2010s mystery films
American mystery films
American psychological horror films
Films about wish fulfillment
2010s English-language films
Films directed by Timothy Woodward Jr.
2010s American films